Oliva bulbosa, common name the swollen olive, is a species of sea snail, a marine gastropod mollusk in the family Olividae, the olives.

References

bulbosa
Gastropods described in 1798